Stenoptilia veronicae is a moth of the family Pterophoridae. It is found in Fennoscandia, Poland, Latvia, Estonia and northern Russia.

The wingspan is 23–26 mm. Adults are on wing from June to August.

The larvae feed on Veronica longifolia.

References

External links
Stenoptilia veronicae - Colour Atlas of the Siberian Lepidoptera

veronicae
Moths described in 1932
Plume moths of Europe